Hoërskool Jan van Riebieck is a public Afrikaans medium co-educational high school situated in Gardens in Cape Town in the Western Cape province of South Africa. It was founded in 1926 by J.J. Jordaan.

Overview
The school is situated at the foot of Table Mountain right next to the historical Welgemeend in Cape Town. The school has an enrollment of approximately 500 pupils, who are divided into three houses: Reijger, Dromedaris and De Goede Hoop, named after the three ships that Jan van Riebeeck landed in Cape Town in 1652. Famous alumni include the singer Laurika Rauch, struggle hero and Minister of Science and Technology Derek Hanekom, venture capitalist Roelof Botha, and judge and struggle hero Jan Steyn.

Boarding
The tradition of boarding at Jan van Riebeeck High dates back to 1953 with the construction of the Huis Jordaan, the then girls hostel, on the school campus, after the Cape Town Administrator and its executive committee decided to make funds available for the construction of residences for the school in 1950. The tradition of boarding continues to this day and has become an integral part of life at the school, with a large number of pupils coming from afar.

Huis Jordaan 
In 1952, the school committee and staff decided that the girls hostel would be called Huis Jordaan, after J.J. Jordaan, the first head of Jan van Riebeeck High School (1926 – 1936). On 9 December 1952, the cornerstone of Huis Jordaan was laid by W. de Vos Malan, Superintendent General of Education, and on 12 January 1953, Huis Jordaan was captured.

The Huis Jordaan facility caters for boys and girls from grade 8 to 12, and accommodates termly and weekly boarders, with students returning home for the school holidays. Being a resident on campus means boarders have easy access to the school facilities. The facility is located next to the historic Welgemeend on the school premises in Kloof Street.

Currently Huis Jordaan is jointly managed by Huibrecht Steyn, the ladies superintendent (house mother), and Jakkie Steyn, the gents superintendent (house father).

In 2016 management started with a building and modernisation process. All boarders receive WiFi connectivity. From 2018 the Huis Jordaan facility accommodates both residences (girls and boys) on the school grounds.

Controversy
In 2004, the then school principal, Hammies van Niekerk, got into trouble for questioning Riaan Vosloo, an prospective job applicants, marital status, circle of friends and sexual orientation during an interview. Vosloo, a bisexual arts teacher ended up getting the job but went on to sue van Niekerk. In the same year van Niekerk sold off school properties including a portion of a sports field worth an estimated R250 million in an effort to raise funds. In 2012 van Niekerk went on early retirement. André Franken took over as headmaster in 2013.

References

 Hoërskool Jan van Riebieck

Afrikaner culture in Cape Town
Schools in Cape Town
1926 establishments in South Africa
Afrikaans-language schools